Bíňa is a municipality and village in the Nové Zámky District in the Nitra Region of south-west Slovakia.

Geography
The village lies at an elevation of 132 metres (433 ft) and covers an area of 23.501 km² (9.074 mi²).

History
In historical records the village was first mentioned in 1135 written as Byn. Earlier the Romans built a fortress here and in 173 emperor Marcus Aurelius wrote his famous diary in this region during the wars against quadi in the Marcomannic Wars. Later, after the foundation of the Árpád age Hungary, king Stephen I of Hungary gave the region to Bény, son of Hont, the count of the county Hont. During the time of early Christianity every 10 villages was ordered to build a church. Several rotunda have been built in this time, among others the rotunda of Bény, too.
In 1217 the Premontre Abbey monastery was founded in Bíňa in the romanesque style. An earlier built rotunda stands before the two tower abbey church. The patrocinium of the rotunda is The 12 Apostles. Such patrocinium of a rotunda was at village Apostag at the Danube. After the Austro-Hungarian army disintegrated in November 1918, Czechoslovak troops occupied the area, later acknowledged internationally by the Treaty of Trianon. Between 1938 and 1945 Bíňa once more became part of Miklós Horthy's Hungary through the First Vienna Award. From 1945 until the Velvet Divorce, it was part of Czechoslovakia. Since then it has been part of Slovakia.

Population
It has a population of about 1464 people. According to last census in Slovakia 2011  it has 82.72% Hungarian, 13.11% Slovak and 0.48% Gypsy.

Facilities
The village has a public library and football pitch.

Gallery

See also
 List of municipalities and towns in Slovakia

References

 Gervers-Molnár Vera: A középkori Magyarország rotundái. (Romanesque Round Churches of Medieval Hungary) (Művészettörténeti Füzetek, 4.) Akadémiai Kiadó. Budapest, 1972.

Genealogical resources

The records for genealogical research are available at the state archive "Statny Archiv in Nitra, Slovakia"

 Roman Catholic church records (births/marriages/deaths): 1724-1895 (parish B)
 Reformated church records (births/marriages/deaths): 1784-1953 (parish B)

External links
Homepage of Bina (Bény)
Information about Bina (Bény)
Bina (Bény) in Slovakia Map
Slovakiatourism.sk
Basic information
Slovenské hrady
The rotunda and the monastery church at Bina (Bény)
Bina (Bény)in the website homepage of istergranum.utikonyvem.hu
Surnames of living people in Bina
Bíňa – Nové Zámky okolie
Bíňa, Vybrané štatistické dáta zo SODB 2011, Obyvateľstvo podľa národnosti

Villages and municipalities in Nové Zámky District